Bradford Forster Square railway station serves Bradford, West Yorkshire, England. The majority of services to/from the railway station use Class 333 electrified trains operated by Northern Trains, on the Airedale Line to Skipton, the Wharfedale Line to Ilkley and the Leeds-Bradford Line to Leeds.

The other main railway station in the city is Bradford Interchange, about 10 minutes on foot from Forster Square, from where services operate along the Caldervale Line to Leeds, Halifax, Huddersfield, Manchester Victoria, Blackpool and London King's Cross. Bradford Interchange is situated at a higher level, across the city centre, than Forster Square. The Bradford Crossrail proposal to link the two stations is currently viewed as unlikely to proceed.

History

The first rail service into Bradford was opened by the Leeds and Bradford Railway on 1 July 1846. The line approached the town from the north, up Bradford Dale from Shipley, and terminated at a railway station on Kirkgate, opposite the end of Market Street. There were hourly services to Leeds Wellington Station, and through trains to London Euston via Derby and Rugby.

The first railway station building was an imposing neoclassical building designed by William Andrews. By 1853, the Midland Railway had acquired the Leeds and Bradford, and rebuilt the station. The new building was larger, but less interesting architecturally.

In 1890, the railway station was again replaced. The Midland Railway's architect Charles Trubshaw designed a large complex containing the passenger station, goods station and the Midland Hotel. The station had six platforms and an overall glazed roof of the ridge and furrow pattern. The station was also used by the North Eastern Railway. The station began to be called Market Street Station at this time, but local maps and directories do not confirm this (see Station name below).

By 1906, Forster Square had been built just south-east of the railway station, but the name Forster Square Station was not used until 1924.

In 1953-54 the station underwent £60,000 of improvements. The glass and steel canopy covering the station was removed and “umbrella type” covers were installed over each platform, leaving the rails clear. 

In March 1963, the Beeching Report recommended the closure of all railways serving Wharfedale, and the removal of several services out of Forster Square. As a consequence, many railway stations closed in 1965, and local services to Leeds ceased. However, the decision to close was deferred for some of the lines. In 1972, Bradford Corporation (now City of Bradford Metropolitan District Council), together with several other local authorities in the area, determined to subsidise the Wharfedale and Airedale lines. The lines have remained open, and in the ensuing years, a number of stations have been reopened. From April 1974, the new West Yorkshire Passenger Transport Executive (now known as Metro) took responsibility for those services.

Forster Square Station was truncated in 1990, when a new station was built on the western side of the former station. The new station has three platforms, two of which (platforms 1 & 2) are able to accommodate intercity trains. The old station was later demolished and a shopping centre called 'Broadgate' was scheduled to be constructed on the site. That development was cancelled because of the early 1990s recession, and the area was used as a car park, but a new tax office was later built there. Part of the screen arcade that fronted the 1890 station, as well as the Midland Hotel, remains. In 2005, these became much more visible, when the city centre redevelopment began and Forster House was demolished.

The line into Forster Square was electrified in 1994, as part of the electrification of the Airedale Line and Wharfedale Line, which allowed through electric trains to London via the newly electrified East Coast Main Line. More recently, the pedestrian approach from Cheapside has been redeveloped, and ticket barriers installed.

Historically, services have been as follows:

Stationmasters

Thomas Fletcher ca. 1859 - 1873 (afterwards secretary and manager of the Bradford Tramway Company)
Robert Smith 1873 - 1897
W.P. Snow 1897 - 1899 (afterwards station master at London St Pancras)
Robert L. Tudor 1899 - 1908  (formerly station master at Hellifield)
James Robert Johnson 1908 - 1913
Frederick William Pugh 1913 - 1930 (formerly station master at Trent Junction)
William Hardy 1930 - 1936 (formerly station master at Lincoln)
Frederick James Stallard 1936 - 1940 (formerly station master at Low Moor)
David Mathieson 1940 - 1948 (formerly station master at Bedford)
R.M. Bradshaw from 1948

Station name

There is some disagreement about what names were used and when. Most modern references state that at least one of them was called 'Market Street', but there is disagreement as to exactly when this name was in use:

 According to Alan Whitaker, it was 'Market Street' from the rebuilding in 1890 until 1924.
 Tony Dewick, p. 42, shows one of the three stations as 'Market Street' in red, which in that book indicates that the station and the name passed out of use before 1901.

However, contemporary sources do not seem to use the name. The Bradford Post Office Directory says that the Midland terminal is at "Station, bottom of Kirkgate" (1856, 1863, 1898) or "Station, Forster Square" (1916, 1927); only in 1928 did a directory use the name "Forster Square Station". (In contrast, from 1879/80 onward the directories show the other terminal as "Exchange Station, Drake St"). Neither the map by Dixon & Hindle  nor the 1906 OS map gives a name for the station other than 'Midland Station', but the latter names 'Exchange Station'.

It seems likely that the original station was called simply 'Bradford', at least until the Lancashire & Yorkshire station opened, at Drake Street in 1850. After then, it would have been the Midland Station. Later, it apparently came to be called 'Bradford Market Street', but that does not appear to have been official. Bradshaw's July 1922 Railway Guide, in a timetable footnote, refers to Market Street and gives the distance to Exchange Station.

Services
Trains from Bradford Forster Square are operated by Northern Trains and London North Eastern Railway. During Monday to Saturday daytimes, trains operate every 30 minutes to Leeds and hourly on the other two routes. On weekday and Saturday evenings there are trains every hour to each of Skipton and Ilkley, but no trains run through to Leeds; instead a shuttle service runs between Bradford and Shipley, connecting there with Skipton – Leeds trains.

On Sundays, trains run hourly between Bradford and Leeds all day (until the end of service) and to both Skipton and Ilkley.  The latter two routes were upgraded from two-hourly frequencies at the December 2017 timetable change.

During off-peak hours most trains use platforms 1 (for Skipton) and 2 (Leeds and Ilkley) – platform 3 is mainly used during weekday peak periods and in the evening, though a spare set is usually stabled here between 09.00 and 16.00 each weekday.

London North Eastern Railway operate two services each way (only one on Sundays) per day via Leeds and the East Coast Main Line to London King's Cross.

References

Further reading

External links

Railway stations in Bradford
DfT Category C2 stations
Former Midland Railway stations
Railway stations in Great Britain opened in 1846 
Railway stations in Great Britain closed in 1890
Railway stations in Great Britain opened in 1890 
Railway stations in Great Britain closed in 1990
Railway stations in Great Britain opened in 1990 
Northern franchise railway stations
Railway stations served by London North Eastern Railway
Buildings and structures in Bradford
Transport in Bradford
1846 establishments in England
Charles Trubshaw railway stations